The Beatrice City Library, at 220 N. 5th St. in Beatrice, Nebraska, was built in 1902-03 and was opened on January 1, 1904.  It was listed on the National Register of Historic Places in 1976.

Designed by architect George A. Berlinghof, who was then based in Beatrice, it is Beaux Arts in style.

The library's creation was the culmination of effort by the Beatrice Literary Club, founded in 1890, which built upon efforts by the local Woman's Christian Temperance Union group which established a circulating library.

References

External links

		
National Register of Historic Places in Gage County, Nebraska
Beaux-Arts architecture in Nebraska
Library buildings completed in 1902
Carnegie libraries in Nebraska